James Donald Rodgers (born March 12, 1943) is an American former basketball coach and team executive.

Life and career 
Rodgers was born and raised in Franklin Park, Illinois, a Chicago suburb. An all-state player as a high school player in Illinois, Rodgers went on to play for Iowa, where he was a three-year starter on the Hawkeyes basketball team. Originally planning to go into dentistry, Rodgers, who was a pre-dental major, decided to go into coaching. After graduation, he was hired as an assistant by Bill Fitch, then the head coach for the University of North Dakota basketball team, whose team featured All-America center Phil Jackson.

Rodgers followed Fitch to the National Basketball Association (NBA) when Fitch was hired as the head coach of the expansion Cleveland Cavaliers in 1970; he would remain with the team for the duration of Fitch's tenure before following him to the Boston Celtics when Fitch became their head coach for the 1979–80 season. Rodgers remained with the team as an assistant under K. C. Jones, who replaced Fitch following the 1982–83 season, also becoming the team's director of player personnel. While hoping to land the New York Knicks head coaching job in 1987, which went to Rick Pitino, Rodgers was promoted to head coach of the Celtics after Jones decided to retire from coaching after the 1987–88 season.

He coached the Celtics for two seasons, with the team going 42–40 in 1988–89 (and a playoff berth and quick first-round exit), due to a season where its star player, Larry Bird, missed all but six games due to injury. After the team rebounded to a 52–30 record the following season, Rodgers was fired after a first-round playoff loss to the Knicks in five games.

He was hired by the expansion Minnesota Timberwolves in 1991, where for nearly a season and a half, with a young team devoid of talent, the Wolves struggled to a combined record of 21–90, before he was fired following the 1992–93 season. He served as an assistant on staffs that won six NBA championships (1981, 1984, and 1986 with the Celtics, and 1996, 1997, and 1998 with the Chicago Bulls, where he reunited with Phil Jackson, who was the team's head coach). During his days as an assistant with the Celtics, he helped coach Celtic players Bird, Kevin McHale, Robert Parish and Dennis Johnson (plus Nate Archibald in 1981 and Bill Walton in 1986). As an assistant for Chicago, he helped Jackson coach championship-winning teams that featured Michael Jordan, Scottie Pippen and Dennis Rodman.

Head coaching record 

|-
| align="left" | Boston
| align="left" | 
| 82 || 42 || 40 ||  ||align="center" | 3rd in Atlantic || 3 || 0 || 3 || 
| align="center" | Lost in First round
|-
| align="left" | Boston
| align="left" | 
| 82 || 52 || 30 ||  ||align="center" | 2nd in Atlantic || 5 || 2 || 3 || 
| align="center" | Lost in First round
|-
| align="left" | Minnesota
| align="left" | 
| 82 || 15 || 67 ||  ||align="center" | 6th in Midwest || – || – || – || 
| align="center" | Missed Playoffs
|-
| align="left" | Minnesota
| align="left" | 
| 29 || 6 || 23 ||  ||align="center" | (fired)|| – || – || – || 
| align="center" | –
|- class="sortbottom"
| align="left" | Career
| || 275 || 115 || 160 ||  || || 8 || 2 || 6 ||  ||

References

External links 
 Basketball-Reference.com: Jimmy Rodgers

1943 births
American men's basketball coaches
American men's basketball players
Arkansas Razorbacks men's basketball coaches
Basketball coaches from Illinois
Basketball players from Illinois
Boston Celtics assistant coaches
Boston Celtics head coaches
Chicago Bulls assistant coaches
Cleveland Cavaliers assistant coaches
Iowa Hawkeyes men's basketball players
Living people
Minnesota Timberwolves head coaches
North Dakota Fighting Hawks men's basketball coaches
Sportspeople from Oak Park, Illinois